William Thomas Cook (January 1884 – 1970) was an American college sports coach. He was Davidson College's head football, men's basketball, baseball, and track and field coaches in the early 1900s. He compiled overall records of 5–9 (football), 0–1 (basketball), and 9–20 (baseball).

Cook, a native of Peru, Illinois, played on baseball and football teams in Cedar Rapids, Iowa in his early life. He eventually attended Iowa State University, playing on the school's athletic teams. Some time shortly thereafter, Cook relocated to Massachusetts where he played on a baseball team in Springfield, served as physical director at Allan's School and coached a football team in Fitchburg. After graduating from the Springfield Y.M.C.A. Training School in 1911, Cook relocated, this time to Pennsylvania to serve as physical director at another school.

Head coaching record

Football

Basketball

Baseball

References

1884 births
1970 deaths
Baseball players from Iowa
Davidson Wildcats baseball coaches
Davidson Wildcats football coaches
Davidson Wildcats men's basketball coaches
Davidson Wildcats track and field coaches
Iowa State Cyclones baseball players
People from Peru, Illinois
Players of American football from Iowa
Springfield College (Massachusetts) alumni